The Minister for Co-ordination of Defence was a British Cabinet-level position established in 1936 to oversee and co-ordinate the rearmament of Britain's defences. It was abolished in 1940.

History
The position was established by Prime Minister Stanley Baldwin in response to criticism that Britain's armed forces were understrength compared to Nazi Germany. This campaign had been led by Winston Churchill, and many expected him to be appointed as the new minister, though nearly every other senior figure in the National Government was also speculated upon by politicians and commentators. Despite this, Baldwin's choice of the Attorney General Sir Thomas Inskip provoked widespread astonishment. A famous remark was "This is the most cynical appointment since Caligula made his horse a consul". The appointment is now regarded as a sign of caution by Baldwin, who did not wish to appoint someone like Churchill who would have been interpreted by foreign powers as a sign of the United Kingdom preparing for war, as well as a desire to avoid taking on board a controversial and radical minister.

In 1939 Inskip was succeeded by First Sea Lord Lord Chatfield. When the Second World War broke out, the new Prime Minister Neville Chamberlain formed a small War Cabinet, and it was expected that Chatfield would serve as a spokesperson for the three service ministers, the Secretary of State for War, the First Lord of the Admiralty and the Secretary of State for Air; however political considerations resulted in all three posts being included in the Cabinet, and Chatfield's role proved increasingly redundant. In April 1940 the position was formally wound up and the functions transferred to other Ministers.

The following month Chamberlain was succeeded as Prime Minister by Churchill, who took the additional title of "Minister of Defence"; this was, however, a separate office from Minister for Coordination of Defence, though the two titles were frequently used interchangeably.

Ministers for Co-ordination of Defence

Notes

Defence Coordination
Defunct ministerial offices in the United Kingdom